Sweitzer Lake State Park is a Colorado state park located in Delta County  south of Delta, Colorado. The  park established in 1960 includes a  reservoir. Facilities include a boat ramp, swim beach and picnic sites. Birdwatchers have spotted 170 different species in the park. A portion of the park's land was donated by the eponymous Morgan Sweitzer in order to develop it as a recreation destination.

References

External links
Official website

State parks of Colorado
Protected areas of Delta County, Colorado
Protected areas established in 1972